Illinois's 4th House of Representatives district is a Representative district within the Illinois House of Representatives located in Cook County, Illinois. It has been represented by Democrat Lilian Jiménez since December 15, 2022. The district was previously represented by Democrat Delia Ramirez from 2018 to 2022.

The district covers parts of Chicago and of Chicago's neighborhoods, it covers parts of Austin, Belmont Cragin, Hermosa, Humboldt Park, and West Town.

Representative district history

Prominent representatives

List of representatives

1849 – 1873

1957 – 1973

1983 – Present

Historic District Boundaries

Electoral history

2030 – 2022

2020 – 2012

2010 – 2002

2000 – 1992

1990 – 1982

1970 – 1962

1960 – 1956

Notes

References

Government of Chicago
Illinois House of Representatives districts